David Orion Martin (born September 2, 1985 in Danville, Virginia) is a former American football defensive end. He was signed by the Miami Dolphins as an undrafted free agent in 2009. He played college football at Virginia Tech.

Martin has also been a member of the Detroit Lions.

Early years
After high school, he played defensive end at Hargrave Prep School for one semester to qualify for college. He attended George Washington High School, Danville, Virginia, prior to that. As a senior, had three sacks, eight receptions for 190 yards, and one interception. He was named first-team all-Western Valley as a senior. He also lettered in basketball as a forward.

College career
In 2008, Martin was named Second-team All-ACC after playing 14 games and making 56 tackles (13 for losses) and 7.5 sacks for the Hokies. In 2007, Martin moved into the starting lineup at end and had 58 total tackles, including 10.5 behind the line, along with 15 hurries and 6.5 sacks. He also batted down five passes and forced a team-high three fumbles. In 2006, he contributed 29 tackles on the season, including 1.5 sacks. The year before, 2005, he played in all 13 games and made 23 tackles, seven quarterback hurries, and three passes broken up. In 2004, Martin joined the team as a walk-on for spring practice. He posted a 350-pound bench press, a 550-pound back squat, and a 34-inch vertical jump in spring testing and also turned in the best 40 meter dash by a defensive end with a time of 4.52 seconds. In 2004, he attended Norfolk State University for the 2004 spring semester, after finishing up at prep school.

Professional career

Pre-draft

Bench presses 400 pounds.

Miami Dolphins
Martin was signed by the Miami Dolphins as an undrafted free agent in 2009. The Dolphins moved Martin from defensive end to inside linebacker. He was waived on August 24.

Detroit Lions
Martin was claimed off waivers by the Detroit Lions on August 25, 2009 when the team released wide receiver Eric Fowler. He was waived on September 4, 2009.

References

External links
Virginia Tech Hokies bio

1985 births
Living people
Sportspeople from Danville, Virginia
Players of American football from Virginia
American football defensive ends
American football linebackers
Virginia Tech Hokies football players
Miami Dolphins players
Detroit Lions players